Peak Mountain may also refer to:

Peak Mountain, a mountain in Connecticut
Peak Mountain (Santa Barbara, California), a mountain in California 
Peak Mountain (San Mateo, California), a mountain in California 
Peak Mountain (Kentucky), a mountain in Kentucky 
Peak Mountain (New York), a mountain in New York 
Peak Mountain (North Carolina), a mountain in North Carolina